Guðmundur Arnar Guðmundsson (born ) is an Icelandic film director and screenwriter.

Filmography 

 Þröng sýn (2005) (Short)
 Jeffrey & Beta (2008) (Short)
 Hvalfjörður (2013) (Short)
 Ártún (2014) (Short)
 Heartstone (Hjartasteinn) (2016) 
  (2022)

References

External links 

 Guðmundur Arnar Guðmundsson at the Icelandic Film Centre
 

1982 births
Guðmundur Arnar Guðmundsson
Guðmundur Arnar Guðmundsson
Living people